96th Brigade may refer to:

 96th Brigade (United Kingdom)
 96th Mixed Brigade (Spain); see 
 96th Sustainment Brigade (United States)